The vice president of South Sudan is the second highest political position obtainable in South Sudan. Additionally, a temporary position called first vice president was created in August 2015.

Vice presidents (2005–2020)

This list contains vice presidents of Southern Sudan (2005–2011, autonomous region of Sudan) and vice presidents of the Republic of South Sudan (2011–present, independent country).

Vice presidents of the Southern Sudan autonomous region (2005–2011)
Colour key (for political parties):

Vice presidents of the Republic of South Sudan (2011–2020)
Colour key (for political parties):

First vice presidents of the Republic of South Sudan (2016–2020)
Following the signing of the Agreement on the Resolution of the Conflict in the Republic of South Sudan (ARCSS) in August 2015 a new position of 'first vice president' was established alongside the pre-existing positions of President of South Sudan and Vice President of South Sudan, with the incumbents in both these positions continuing in office. Unlike the positions of president and vice president, which are permanent features of the Constitution, the office of first vice president will cease to exist following the end of the transitional period stipulated in the ARCSS unless otherwise decided in the permanent Constitution.

Colour key (for political parties):

Vice presidents in the unity government (since 2020)
The Revitalised Transitional Government of National Unity (RTGoNU) was formed in February 2020 and included five vice presidents.

See also
 Southern Sudan Autonomous Region (1972–1983)
 Southern Sudan Autonomous Region (2005–2011)
 Politics of South Sudan
 List of governors of pre-independence Sudan
 List of heads of state of South Sudan
 List of current vice presidents

References

Government of South Sudan
 
South Sudan
South Sudan
2011 establishments in South Sudan